Konda–Yahadian is a pair of South Bird's Head languages spoken in New Guinea:
 Konda
 Yahadian

Noting low cognacy rates, Holton and Klamer (2018) tentatively consider Konda–Yahadian, as well as Inanwatan–Duriankere and the Nuclear South Bird's Head family to each be independent language families until further evidence can be demonstrated.

References

 
South Bird's Head languages
Languages of western New Guinea